The 1925 Manhattan College football team was an American football team that represented Manhattan College as an independent during the 1925 college football season.  In its first season under head coach James F. McCarthy, the team compiled a 1–6–1 record and was outscored by a total of 216 to 47.

Schedule

References

Manhattan
Manhattan Jaspers football seasons
Manhattan College football